Harrison Township is one of nine townships in Spencer County, Indiana. As of the 2010 census, its population was 2,000 and it contained 770 housing units. Because of the presence of the St. Meinrad Archabbey, the Roman Catholic parishes in this township are under the jurisdiction of the Archdiocese of Indianapolis and not the Diocese of Evansville with the rest of Spencer County.

History
Harrison Township was organized in January 1841, and named for William Henry Harrison (1773–1841) the ninth President of the United States (1841).

The Huffman Mill Covered Bridge and St. Boniface Catholic Church are listed on the National Register of Historic Places.

Geography

Unincorporated towns
Fulda
Huffman
St. Meinrad

References

External links
 Indiana Township Association
 United Township Association of Indiana

Townships in Spencer County, Indiana
Townships in Indiana